Sister Edith Pfau, S.P., (1915–2001) was an American painter, sculptor, and art educator known for her religious works and commissions.

Born Alberta Henrietta Pfau in Jasper, Indiana, she began drawing at a very early age. Later in her life she recalled, "I always was attracted to faces. I find faces everywhere, even in scribbles on the wall."

Pfau entered the Sisters of Providence of Saint Mary-of-the-Woods in 1933 at the age of 18, taking the religious name Sister Edith. Her main ministry as a Sister was teaching art and English in Indiana, Illinois, Washington, D.C., California and Taiwan. Pfau's education ministry included eleven years teaching at Saint Mary-of-the-Woods College, eleven years at Immaculata Junior College in Washington, D.C., and ten years at Providence University in Shalu, Taichung, Taiwan.

Education
Pfau earned a bachelor's degree in English and art from Saint Mary-of-the-Woods College in 1941. Beginning in 1944 she attended summer sessions at the Art Institute of Chicago with the intent of pursuing a master's degree, but was unable to complete the program due to her teaching responsibilities. In 1951 she earned her Master's from Indiana State University, and a doctorate in education followed from Ball State University in 1971. As an academic, she focused on the subject of art in secondary Catholic education. Pfau also completed numerous summer sessions from the University of Notre Dame and The Catholic University of America.

Works and honors
Pfau worked in a variety of media including oil, tempera, ceramics, polymer, wood and metal sculpture, silkscreen, and acrylic. Well-known works include "Risen Christ" (oil, 1964), "Stations of the Cross" (egg-oil tempera, 1951), "Madonna and Child" (sculpmetal and polymer, 1953), and "St. Joseph and Child" (walnut sculpture, 1959).

She became known for colorful religious paintings, often utilizing intersections of straight and curved lines and overlapping shapes. Her oil painting "Mater Salvatoris" (c. 1958) is an example of this technique. Numerous churches commissioned works from her including a set of stations of the cross for Our Lady Providence church in Brownstown, Indiana, another set for St. Francis Savier Church (Wilmette, Illinois), and "Christ the Pantokrator" for St. Cecilia Church in Tustin, California. Several of her screen print card designs were printed and produced by Community Art Chicago in the 1950s.

Pfau's work was exhibited at the Metropolitan Museum of Art in 1947 in an Exhibit of Sisters' Manuscripts. Throughout her career, Pfau won numerous awards for her work including first prize in oils from the Indiana College Art Exhibit (1935), first prize in painting at the Wabash Valley Art Exhibition held at Swope Art Museum (1946), several awards from the national Art for Religion exhibits (1959 and 1969). She earned a solo show of polymer painting and serigraphs during her doctorate studies at Ball State University in 1969.

References

1915 births
2001 deaths
Sisters of Providence of Saint Mary-of-the-Woods
Saint Mary-of-the-Woods College alumni
Indiana State University alumni
Ball State University alumni
20th-century American Roman Catholic nuns
Catholic painters
American women painters
Catholic University of America alumni
People from Jasper, Indiana
American women sculptors
20th-century American sculptors
20th-century American painters
20th-century American women artists
Catholics from Indiana
Nuns and art
Catholic sculptors
Female Catholic artists